The Yarlung dynasty, or Pre-Imperial Tibet, was a proto-historical dynasty in Tibet before the rise of the historical Tibetan Empire in the 7th century.

The Yarlung dynasty rulers are more mythological than factual, and there is insufficient evidence of their definitive existence.

History

See also
List of emperors of Tibet

References

History of Tibet
7th century in Tibet
Former countries in Chinese history